Koelnmesse GmbH (Cologne Trade Fair) is an international trade fair and exhibition center located in Cologne, North Rhine-Westphalia, Germany. With around 80 trade fairs and over 2,000 conferences annually, Koelnmesse is one of the country's largest trade fair organisers and with 284,000 m² exhibition floor area the third largest by area.

The Cologne Trade Fair ground was founded in 1922. Until 2005, the trade fair was based in the historic Rheinhallen, and since then moved into new premises next to them. The old Fair Tower Cologne (Messeturm Köln) is a landmark building from 1928 and features a tower restaurant on the top floor.

Since 2018, the fair has been undergoing the greatest renovation works in its history. They are expected to last until 2030 and cost €600 million. Two thirds of that amount will be spent renovating the seven southern halls, dating from the 1970s.

Trade fairs 
The following trade fairs, among others, are held in Cologne:

 Anuga, the world's most important food and beverage trade fair
 Anuga FoodTec, the supplier fair for the food and drink industry
 Art Cologne
 Dmexco, the leading international exposition and conference for the digital industry
 EuVend, the international trade fair for the vending industry
 Gamescom, most important trade fair for interactive games and entertainment in Europe
 Imm Cologne, leading trade fair for the furniture sector
 Intermot, international motorcycle, scooter and bicycle fair
 Internationale Süßwarenmesse (ISM), world's largest confectionery trade fair
 Photokina, the world's leading fair for photography and imaging

Location 

The trade fair grounds lie in Cologne's right-Rhenish district of Deutz, directly adjacent to Köln Messe/Deutz station to the south. Among others, the station has ICE connections by Deutsche Bahn to Köln Hbf and Cologne/Bonn Airport. West of the trade fair grounds lies the Rheinpark, a 40 hectare large park on the River Rhine, and Tanzbrunnen, an open-air theater.

Apart from the Köln Messe/Deutz station to the south, the Cologne trade fair center is also served by the Cologne Stadtbahn Koelnmesse station to the East.

Subsidiaries

Image gallery

References

External links 

 Koelnmesse.com 
 koelnkongress.com 

Tourist attractions in Cologne
Buildings and structures in Cologne
Economy of Cologne
Convention centres in Germany
Trade fairs in Germany
Event venues established in 1924
1924 establishments in Germany